Mongolotettix japonicus is a species of slant-faced grasshopper in the family Acrididae. It is found in eastern Asia.

References

Further reading

External links

 

Gomphocerinae